Sir John Evelyn, 1st Baronet (1 March 1682 – July 1763) of Wotton, Surrey, was a British official and politician who sat in the House of Commons from 1708 to 1710. His grandfather, the diarist John Evelyn, influenced his independent attitude in politics and stimulated his dedication to literature. His public offices included Postmaster-general from 1708 to 1715.

Early life
Evelyn was born on 1 March 1682 at Sayes Court in Deptford, Kent, the second but only surviving son of John Evelyn the Younger, barrister of the Middle Temple and Commissioner of the Revenue, and his wife, Martha Spencer, daughter and co-heir of Richard Spencer. He was baptised the following day. He was educated at the French school at Greenwich in 1689, at Kings Street under Mr Arbuthnot in 1691 and at Eton College from 1692 to 1698. He matriculated at Balliol College, Oxford, on 25 February 1699, aged 16. His father died in 1699, leaving him heir apparent to the Wotton estate.

Career

Evelyn came under the patronage of Sidney Godolphin, Lord Treasurer, a close family friend who helped him to government places.  He was appointed Receiver of stamp duties in 1703, and Commissioner for prizes in 1705. He married Godolphin's niece on 18 September 1705, at Lambeth. She was Anne Boscowen, eldest daughter of Edward Boscawen of Cornwall and his wife Jael Godolphin, the daughter of Sir Francis Godolphin.

Evelyn succeeded his grandfather, the diarist John Evelyn, to Wotton on 27 February 1706. In August 1708 he surrendered his two government places when he was appointed joint Postmaster General which he held until 1715.

Evelyn had been advised by his grandfather, that if he sought electoral success, to do so  'without affectation and vainglory .. or the being carried away by a faction or to serve a party'. His politics were therefore difficult to pin down. In 1705, he led his family's tenants to vote for the Tory in protest against the corruption of the Whig financier Sir William Scawen.  He was returned as Member of Parliament for Helston which was dominated by his Whig patron Godolphin, at a by election on 15 December 1708. He supported the Whigs over the naturalization of the Palatines in 1709, and then voted for the impeachment of Dr Sacheverell in 1710. He did not stand at the 1710 British general election but managed to keep his office under the new ministry. He tended to show local support for the Tories. On 6 August 1713, he was created a baronet of Wotton in the County of Surrey in the Baronetage of Great Britain.

After the Whig Administration came to power in 1715 he lost his place at the Post Office within a few months. In December 1717 he stood for Parliament again at a by-election for Surrey, but was unsuccessful against the Onslow interest. In 1721 he regained ministerial favour from Walpole and was appointed Commissioner of Customs, which he held until 1763.

Evelyn dedicated much of his time to improving the Wootton estate and to scholarly studies. He was elected a Fellow of the Royal Society in January 1723. At Wootton House, he built a private library, 45 feet long, to house the collection of books accumulated over three generations.

Death and legacy
Evelyn and his wife had six sons of whom three survived and three daughter of whom two survived. His wife died, aged 67, in 1752 and was buried at Wotton on 24 January 1752. Evelyn died on 15 or 18 July 1763, and was buried at Wotton on 22 July. He was succeeded by his eldest son, John. His son William was also MP for Helston and raised a monument to his parents.

Notes

References

Further reading
Robert Beatson, A Chronological Register of Both Houses of Parliament (London: Longman, Hurst, Res & Orme, 1807) 
Perry Gauci (2002) "EVELYN, John II (1682–1763), of Wotton, Surr., and St. James's, Westminster" The History of Parliament: the House of Commons 1690–1715, edited by D. Hayton, E. Cruickshanks, S. Handley

1682 births
1763 deaths
Alumni of Balliol College, Oxford
Members of the Parliament of Great Britain for constituencies in Cornwall
British MPs 1708–1710
United Kingdom Postmasters General
Baronets in the Baronetage of Great Britain
Fellows of the Royal Society